Pierre Guichard (5 November 1939 – 6 April 2021) was a French historian, archeologist, medievalist, and academic. He specialized in Al-Andalus and western Muslims during the Middle Ages.

Biography
A professor of history at Lumière University Lyon 2, Guichard directed the Centre interuniversitaire d'histoire et d'archéologie médiévales from 1994 to 2003. He studied the history of Muslim Spain and its relations with the Christian world. He was a member of the Casa de Velázquez in Madrid. He became a correspondent for the Académie des Inscriptions et Belles-Lettres on 27 March 1998.

Pierre Guichard died on 6 April 2021 at the age of 81.

Works

Books
Structures sociales « orientales » et « occidentales » dans l'Espagne musulmane (1977)
Les châteaux ruraux d'al-Andalus. Histoire et archéologie des husun du sud-est de l'Espagne (1988)
Les Musulmans de Valence et la Reconquête (1991)
Du parchemin au papier. Comprendre le XIIIe siècle, in Mélanges offerts à Marie-Thérèse Lorcin (1995)
États, sociétés et cultures dans le monde musulman médiéval (2000)
Espagne et Sicile musulmanes aux XIe et XIIe siècles (2000)
Relations des pays d'islam avec le monde latin (2000)
Al-Andalus, 711-1492 (2001)
Les royaumes de taifas (2007)
Les débuts du monde musulman, VIIe-Xe siècle (2012)

Articles
Le peuplement de la région de Valence aux deux premiers siècles de la domination musulmane (1969)
Les villes d'al-Andalus et de l'Occident musulman aux premiers siècles de leur histoire. Genèse de la ville islamique en al-Andalus et au Maghreb occidental (1998)
À propos de l'identité andalouse: Quelques éléments pour un débat (1999)
La maîtrise de l'eau en al-Andalus, Paysages, pratiques et techniques, article: L'aménagement et la mise en culture des marjales de la région valencienne au début du XIVe siècle

References

1939 births
2021 deaths
20th-century French historians
20th-century French archaeologists
French medievalists
Academic staff of the University of Lyon
University of Lyon alumni
People from Isère
21st-century French historians
Scholars of Al-Andalus history